The 2023 Cincinnati Bearcats football team will represent the University of Cincinnati during the 2023 NCAA Division I FBS football season. The Bearcats, members of the Big 12 Conference, play home games at Nippert Stadium in Cincinnati, Ohio. 2023 is the program's first season under head coach Scott Satterfield.

In September 2021, Cincinnati, BYU, Houston, and UCF accepted bids to join the Big 12. On June 10, the American Athletic Conference and the three American Athletic Conference schools schools set to depart from the league (Cincinnati, Houston, and UCF) announced that they had reached a buyout agreement with the conference that will allow those schools to join the Big 12 Conference in 2023. BYU had previously operated as an independent prior to accepting a membership invitation to join the Big 12 conference.

Previous season 
The Bearcats finished 2022 season 9–3, 6–2 in AAC play. The Bearcats were selected to participate in the Fenway Bowl against Lousiville. The Bearcats lost to Louisville 24–7.

Offseason

NFL Draft

Coaching changes
On November 27, 2022, head coach Luke Fickell, who had been the Bearcats head coach the last six years, left the school to take the same role at Wisconsin.

On December 5, 2022, Scott Satterfield, who had been the Louisville Cardinals head coach the last four years, left the school to become the Cincinnati head coach.

On December 6, 2022, it was reported that Bryan Brown would follow Satterfield to Cincinnati as defensive coordinator.

On December 14, 2022, Satterfield announced additions to the coaching and support staffs.  Joining the Bearcats are Nic Cardwell, Derek Nicholson, De'Rail Sims and Pete Thomas. Official titles and responsibilities will be announced at a later date.

On January 4, 2023, Satterfield announced further staff additions, which included Greg Gasparato and Josh Stepp as well as his strength and conditioning staff led by Niko Palazeti.

On January 9, 2023, Satterfield announced the hiring of Tom Manning as offensive coordinator and tight ends coach. Other staff announced were Zach Grant as General Manager, Jack Griffith as Director of Player Personal, Cass Simmons as Director of Recruiting Strategy, and Carolina Tart as Director of Recruiting.

On February 20, 2023, Manning was reported to be leaving the Bearcats to become the next tight ends coach for the Indianapolis Colts. 

After departures of Manning, Nicholson, and Gasparato in February, Satterfield announced the hiring of Brad Glenn as offensive coordinator/wide receivers coach, Nate Fuqua as co-defensive coordinator and outside linebackers coach, and Cortney Braswell as inside linebackers coach. Josh Stepp, previously named wide receivers coach, was named the tight end coach.

Offseason departures

Transfers

Outgoing

Incoming

Recruiting

Preseason

Award watch lists

Big 12 Conference preseason media poll

Schedule

Game summaries

After the season

Awards and Big 12 honors

References

Cincinnati
Cincinnati Bearcats football seasons
Cincinnati Bearcats football